VST 3 is the fourth studio album by the Filipino group VST & Company. The back cover marked the second time that the lead singer Vic Sotto is included.

The medley "VST Concerto In A Minor" (written by Vic Sotto) included the hit single "Rock Baby Rock". While "Kiss Kiss" is always included on one of TVJ's setlist when they are performing VST songs in Eat Bulaga!, and the song's intro used for the Filipino radio DZMM on its segment Radyo Patrol Sais Trenta.

Track listing
Side one

Side two

References

1979 albums
VST & Co. albums